Osumacinta is a town and one of the 119 Municipalities of Chiapas, in southern Mexico.

As of 2010, the municipality had a total population of 3,792, up from 3,132 as of 2005. It covers an area of 221.1 km².

As of 2010, the town of Osumacinta had a population of 2,023. Other than the town of Osumacinta, the municipality had 15 localities, none of which had a population over 1,000.

References

Municipalities of Chiapas